Ramayani is a 1945 Hindi mythological film directed by Sarvottam Badami for Purnima Productions. The music direction was by S. N. Tripathi with lyrics written by Bekal. Several films were made in that era based on the Ramayana. Vijay Bhatt made his famous Ram Rajya (1943), and  Purnima Productions made their version of the epic, titling it  Ramayani. The film starred Pahari Sanyal, Nargis, Chandra Mohan, Rose, Kanhaiyalal and Amirbai Karnataki.

Cast
 Pahari Sanyal
 Nargis
 Chandra Mohan
 Rose
 Moni Chatterjee
 Kanhaiyalal
 Prabha
 Amirbai Karnataki

Music
The music was composed by S. N. Tripathi with the lyrics written by Bekal.

Song List

References

External links

1945 films
1940s Hindi-language films
Films based on the Ramayana
Indian black-and-white films
Films directed by Sarvottam Badami